O'Chiese 203 is an Indian reserve in Alberta, Canada and is one of two reserves under the administration of the O'Chiese First Nation, a Saulteaux government. The reserve is bordered by Clearwater County to the west and east, Brazeau County to the north, and the Sunchild 202 Indian Reserve to the south.

References 

Indian reserves in Alberta